Bursa ranelloides is a species of sea snail, a marine gastropod mollusc in the family Bursidae, the frog shells.

Distribution
This species occurs in European waters, the Caribbean Sea and the Gulf of Mexico; and off South Africa, the Philippines and Japan.

Description 
The maximum recorded shell length of Bursa ranelloides tenuisculpta is 75 mm.

Habitat 
Minimum recorded depth of Bursa ranelloides tenuisculpta is 30 m. Maximum recorded depth is 250 m.

References

 Kosuge S. (1979) Report on the Mollusca on guyots from the Central Pacific collected by the 2nd and 3rd cruises of R/V Kaiyomaru in 1972 to 73 with descriptions of twelve new species. Bulletin of the Institute of Malacology, Tokyo 1(2): 24-35, pls 5-6. [30 November 1979] page(s): 31, pl. 5 fig. 5, pl. 6 fig. 23
 Gofas, S.; Le Renard, J.; Bouchet, P. (2001). Mollusca, in: Costello, M.J. et al. (Ed.) (2001). European register of marine species: a check-list of the marine species in Europe and a bibliography of guides to their identification. Collection Patrimoines Naturels, 50: pp. 180–213 
 Rosenberg, G., F. Moretzsohn, and E. F. García. 2009. Gastropoda (Mollusca) of the Gulf of Mexico, Pp. 579–699 in Felder, D.L. and D.K. Camp (eds.), Gulf of Mexico–Origins, Waters, and Biota. Biodiversity. Texas A&M Press, College Station, Texas.

External links
 

Bursidae
Gastropods described in 1844